Still the Cross is the eighth album by Contemporary Christian music group FFH. It was released on September 14, 2004. The album peaked at #10 on the Billboard Hot Christian Albums.

Track listing
"You Drive I'll Ride" (Jeromy Deibler, Brian Smith) - 3:56
"You Love Me Anyway" (Deibler, Smith) - 4:30
"Without You" (Deibler, Michael Boggs, Aaron Benward) - 3:35
"Still the Cross" (Deibler, Donna Smith, Scott Williamson) - 5:03
"You and Only You" (Deibler, Boggs) - 3:36
"The Long Haul" (Deibler) - 4:11
"In This Moment" (Boggs, Johnathan Crumpton, Tony Wood) - 3:46
"Cover Me" (Deibler, Smith, Trent Dilfer) - 4:10
"All Part of the Walk" (Deibler, Smith) - 3:49
"Another Day With You" (Boggs) - 3:34

Personnel 
FFH
 Michael Boggs – guitars, backing vocals 
 Jennifer Deibler – lead vocals, backing vocals 
 Jeromy Deibler – lead vocals, acoustic piano, guitars 
 Brian Smith – bass, backing vocals 

Musicians
 Byron Hagan – keyboards, bar room piano, Hammond B3 organ
 Blair Masters – keyboards, Hammond B3 organ
 Jeff Roach – programming 
 Scott Williamson – keyboard and bass programming, drums, percussion, tambourine, drum programming, string arrangements (4, 6)
 Mark Baldwin – electric guitar
 Lincoln Brewster – electric guitar 
 Greg Hagen – acoustic guitar, electric guitar 
 Jerry McPherson – electric guitar
 Dale Oliver – acoustic guitar, electric guitar, mandolin
 Joey Canaday – bass 
 Jason Trimble – drums 
 Mark Douthit – saxophones (2)
 Chris McDonald – trombone (2), brass arrangements (2)
 Jeff Bailey – trumpet (2)
 Mike Haynes – trumpet (2)
 Dave Williamson – string arrangements (8)
 Carl Gorodetzky – string contractor (4, 6, 8)
 The Nashville String Machine – strings (4, 6, 8)

Choir on "Still The Cross"
 Craig Adams – director and conductor 
 Craig Adams, Julie Balcom, Dorinda Boggs, Ryan Brewer, Ariana Bryant, Lesley Caraway, Marvin Copaus, Angela Garrison, Kacy Holman, Pamela Kelly, Marissa Murphy, Dean Newkirk, Shanda Perkins, Kim Shrum and Vicki Willis – choir singers

Production 
 Bob Wohler – executive producer 
 Jeromy Deibler – co-executive producer 
 John Mayfield – mastering at Mayfield Mastering (Nashville, Tennessee)
 Michelle Pearson – A&R production 
 Tim Parker – art direction, design, cross photography 
 Andrew Southam – photography 
 Ron Roark – cross photography
 Mike Atkins Entertainment – management

Tracks 1, 2, 4, 5, 6, 8 & 9 
 Scott Williamson – producer, band track recording, overdub recording, vocal recording 
 Randy Poole – band track recording, mixing (4, 5)
 Todd Robbins – band track recording, mixing (1, 2, 8)
 Brent King – string recording (4, 6, 8)
 Shane D. Wilson – mixing (6, 9)
 Lincoln Brewster – additional recording 
 Philip Cooper – assistant engineer
 Chris Henning – assistant engineer 
 Michael Modesto – assistant engineer 
 Kevin Pickle – assistant engineer 
 Erik Tonkin – assistant engineer 
 Garrett Williamson – assistant engineer 
 Recorded at Dark Horse Recording, The Carpel Tunnel, The Sound Kitchen and Classic Recording Studios (Franklin, Tennessee); OmniSound Studios (Nashville, Tennessee); Linc's Crib (Roseville, California).
 Mixed at John Lawry's Studio and The Poole Room (Franklin, Tennessee); Pentavarit (Nashville, Tennessee).

Tracks 3, 7 & 10 
 Mark Miller – producer 
 Sam Hewitt – recording, mixing
 Recorded and Mixed at Zoo Studios (Franklin, Tennessee).

Awards

On 2005, the title song was nominated for a Dove Award for Inspirational Recorded Song of the Year at the 36th GMA Dove Awards.

References

FFH (band) albums
2004 albums
Essential Records (Christian) albums